Social impact theory was created by Bibb Latané in 1981 and consists of four basic rules which consider how individuals can be "sources or targets of social influence". Social impact is the result of social forces including the strength of the source of impact, the immediacy of the event, and the number of sources exerting the impact. The more targets of impact that exist, the less impact each individual target has.

Original research
According to psychologist Bibb Latané, social impact is defined as any influence on individual feelings, thoughts or behavior that is created from the real, implied or imagined presence or actions of others. The application of social impact varies from diffusion of responsibility to social loafing, stage fright or persuasive communication. In 1981, Latané developed the social impact theory using three key variables:
 Strength (S) is a net of all individual factors that make a person influential. It covers stable, trans-situational, intrapersonal factors—size, intellect, wealth—as well as dynamic, situation-specific relational components like belonging to the same group.
 Immediacy (I) takes into account how recent the event occurred and whether or not there were other intervening factors
 The number of sources (N) refers to the amount of sources of influence
With these variables, Latané developed three laws through formulas—social forces, psychosocial, and multiplication/division of impact.

Social forces 
The social forces law states that i = f(S * I * N). Impact (i) is a function of the three variables multiplied and grows as each variable is increased. However, if a variable were to be 0 or significantly low, the overall impact would be affected.

Psychosocial law 
The psychosocial law states that the most significant difference in social impact will occur in the transition from 0 to 1 source and as the number of sources increases, this difference will become even eventually. The equation Latané uses for this law is
 
That is, some power (t) of the number of people (N) multiplied by the scaling constant (s) determines social impact.  Latané applied this theory to previous studies done on imitation and conformity as well as on embarrassment. Asch's study of conformity in college students contradicts the psychosocial law, showing that one or two sources of social impact make little difference. However, Gerard, Wilhelmy, and Conolley conducted a similar study on conformity sampling from high school students. High school students were deemed less likely to be resistant to conformity than college students, and thus may be more generalizable, in this regard, than Asch's study. Gerard, Wilhelmy, and Conolley's study supported the psychosocial law, showing that the first few confederates had the greatest impact on conformity.  Latané applied his law to imitation as well, using Milgram's gawking experiment. In this experiment various numbers of confederates stood on a street corner in New York craning and gawking at the sky. The results showed that more confederates meant more gawkers, and the change became increasingly insignificant as more confederates were present.  In a study Latané and Harkins conducted on stage fright and embarrassment, the results also followed the psychosocial law showing that more audience members meant greater anxiety and that the greatest difference existed between 0 and 1 audience members.

Multiplication/divisions of impact 
The third law of social impact states that the strength, immediacy, and number of targets play a role in social impact. That is, the more strength and immediacy and the greater number of targets in a social situation causes the social impact to be divided amongst all of the targets. The equation that represents this division is

This law relates to diffusion of responsibility, in which individuals feel less accountable as the number of people present increases. In emergency situations, the impact of the emergency is reduced when more people are present.

The social impact theory is both a generalizable and a specific theory. It uses one set of equations, which are applicable to many social situations. For example, the psychosocial law can be used to predict instances of conformity, imitation and embarrassment. Yet, it is also specific because the predictions that it makes are specific and can be applied to and observed in the world. The theory is falsifiable as well. It makes predictions through the use of equations; however, the equations may not be able to accurately predict the outcome of social situations. Social impact theory is also useful. It can be used to understand which social situations result in the greatest impact and which situations present exceptions to the rules.
 
While social impact theory explores social situations and can help predict the outcomes of social situations, it also has some shortcomings and questions that are left unresolved. The rules guiding the theory depict people as recipients that passively accept social impact and do not take into account the social impact that people may actively seek out. The model is also static, and does not fully compensate for the dynamics involved in social interactions. The theory is relatively new and fails to address some pertinent issues. These issues include finding more accurate ways to measure social outcomes, understanding the "t" exponent in psychosocial law, taking susceptibility into account, understanding how short-term consequences can develop into chronic consequences, application to group interactions, understanding the model's nature (descriptive vs. explanatory, generalization vs. theory).

Applying social impact theory 
The social impact theory specifies the effects of social variables—strength, immediacy, and number of sources—but does not explain the nature of these influencing processes. There are various factors not considered by experimenters while implementing the theory. Concepts such as peripheral persuasion affect how communicators may be more credible to some individuals and untrustworthy to others. The variables are inconsistent from individual to individual, possibly associating strength with source credibility and attractiveness or immediacy with physical closeness. Therefore, in the application of the social impact theory, the idea of persuasiveness, the ability to induce someone with an opposing position to change, and supportiveness, the ability to help those who agree with someone's point of view to resist the influence of others, is introduced. Ultimately, an individual's likelihood of change and being influenced is a direct function of strength (persuasiveness), immediacy and the number of advocates and is a direct inverse function of strength (supportiveness), immediacy and number of target individuals.

Subsequent development
The dynamic social impact theory, as proposed by Bibb Latané and his colleagues, describes the influence of members between majority and minority groups. The theory serves as extension of the originating social impact theory (i.e., influence is determined by the strength, immediacy, and number of sources present) as it explains how groups, as complex systems, change and develop over time. Groups are constantly organizing and re-organizing into four basic patterns: consolidation, clustering, correlation, and continuing diversity. These patterns are consistent with groups that are spatially distributed and interacting repeatedly over time.

1. Consolidation – as individuals interact with each other regularly, their actions, attitudes, and opinions become more uniform. The opinions held by the majority tend to spread throughout the group, while the minority decreases in size.

 E.g., Individuals who live in the same college dormitory will, over time, develop similar attitudes on a variety of topics.

2. Clustering – occurs when group members communicate more frequently as a consequence of close proximity. As the law of social impact suggests, individuals are susceptible to influence by their closest members, and so clusters of group members with similar opinions emerge in groups. Minority group members are often shielded from majority influence due to clustering. Therefore, subgroups can emerge which may possess similar ideas to one another, but hold different beliefs than the majority population.

 E.g., Neighbours on a sub-urban street convince other neighbours to form a community-watch group. 

3. Correlation – over time, individual group members' opinions on a variety of issues (including issues that have never been openly discussed before) converge, so that their opinions become correlated.

 E.g., Individuals on an executive society (i.e., Board of Directors), find they agree on topics they have discussed throughout a conference - such as the best financial plan, but that they also agree on topics they have never discussed: the best restaurant to eat in the city. 

4. Continuing diversity – as mentioned previously, minority members are often shielded from majority influence due to clustering. Diversity exists if the minority group can resist majority influence and communicate with majority members. However, if the majority is large or minority members are physically isolated from one another, this diversity decreases.

 E.g., A jury of 10 members collect in a boardroom to provide a final verdict (must be unanimous). Two members of the jury disagree with the majority, and thus, delay the final decision (continues diversity).

Contemporary research
In 1985 Mullen analyzed two of the factors that Latané associated with social impact theory. Mullen conducted a meta-analysis that examined the validity of the source strength and the source immediacy. The studies that were analyzed were sorted by the method of measurement used with the self-reported in one category and the behavior measurements in the other category. Mullen's results showed that the source strength and immediacy were only supported in cases in which tension was self-reported, and not when behavior was measured.  He thus concluded that Latané's source strength and immediacy were weak and lacked consistency. Critics of Mullen's study, however, argue that perhaps not enough studies were available or included, which may have skewed his results and given him an inaccurate conclusion.

A study conducted by Constantine Sedikides and Jeffrey M. Jackson took another look at the role of strength and within social impact theory. This study was conducted in a bird house at a zoo. In one scenario, an experimenter dressed as a bird keeper walked into the bird house and told visitors that leaning on the railing was prohibited. This was considered the high-strength scenario because of the authority that a zookeeper possesses within a zoo. The other scenario involved an experimenter dressed in ordinary clothes addressing the visitors with the same message. The results of the study showed that visitors responded better to the high-strength scenario, with fewer individuals leaning on the railing after the zookeeper had told them not to.  The study also tested the effect that immediacy had on social impact. This was done by measuring the incidences of leaning on the rail both immediately after the message was delivered and at a later point in time. The results showed that immediacy played a role in determining social impact since there were fewer people leaning on the rails immediately after the message. The visitors in the bird house were studied as members of the group they came with to determine how number of targets would influence the targets' behavior. The group size ranged from 1 to 6 and the results showed that those in larger groups were less likely to comply with the experimenter's message than those in smaller groups. All of these findings support the parameters of Latané's social impact theory.

Kipling D. Williams, and Karen B. Williams theorized that social impact would vary depending on the underlying motive of compliance. When compliance is simply a mechanism to induce the formation of a positive impression, stronger sources should produce a greater social impact. When it is an internal motive that induces compliance, the strength of the source shouldn't matter. Williams and Williams designed a study in which two persuasion methods were utilized, one that would evoke external motivation and one that would evoke internal motivation. Using these techniques, experimenters went from door to door using one of the techniques to attempt to collect money for a zoo.  The foot-in-the-door technique was utilized to evoke the internal motive. In this technique, the experimenter would make an initial request that was relatively small, and gradually request larger and larger amounts. This is internally motivated because the target's self-perception is altered to feel more helpful after the original contribution. The door-in-the-face technique, on the other hand, involves the experimenter asking for a large amount first; and when the target declines, they ask for a much smaller amount as a concession. This technique draws on external motivation because the request for a concession makes one feel obliged to comply. The experiment was conducted with low-strength and high-strength experimenters. Those who were approached by higher-strength experimenters were more likely to contribute money. Using the different persuasion approaches did not produce statistically significant results; however, it did support Williams and Williams hypothesis that the strength of the experimenter would heighten the effects of the door-in-the-face technique, but have minimal effect on the foot-in-the-door technique

One study conducted by Helen Harton and colleagues examined the four patterns of dynamic social impact theory. The study included one large (six rows of 15-30 people) and two small introductory psychology classes (one group per class). Ten questions were chosen from course-readings and either distributed as a hand-out, read aloud, or presented on an overhead projector. Students were given ~1 min per question to mark their pre-discussion answers. The students were then instructed to discuss each question for 1 or 2 minutes with their neighbours (on either side), but only about the assigned questions - which answer they chose and why. There was little initial diversity on two of the questions - one was too easy (majority got it), and the other was too difficult (majority agreeing on the wrong answer). Consolidation- overall, discussion-induced consolidation occurred in 7 out of the 8 independent groups, indicating majority members converting minority members. Clustering- prior to discussion, neighbours answers were evenly distributed. Post-discussion, groups exhibited a significant degree of spatial clustering, as neighbours influenced each other to become more similar. Correlation- there was an increased tendency for an answer on one question to be associated with an answer on another question that was completely unrelated content-wise. Continuing Diversity- none of the 8 groups reached unanimity on any of the questions - meaning, minority group members did not completely conform to majority group members.

Due to social media's influence, there has been movement towards e-commerce.  Researchers have since looked into the relationship between social media influence and visit and purchase intentions within individuals.

Most recently, Rodrigo Perez-Vega, Kathryn Waite, and Kevin O'Gorman suggest that the theory is also relevant in the context of social media. Empirical research on this context has found support for the effects of numbers of sources (i.e. likes) in performance outcomes such as box office sales. Furthermore, Babajide Osatuyi and Katia Passerini operationalized strength, immediacy, and number using Social Network Analysis centrality measures, i.e., betweeness, closeness, and degree centralities to test two of the rules stipulated in social impact theory. They compared the influence of using Twitter and discussion board in a learning management system (e.g., Moodle and Blackboard) on student performance, measured as final grade in a course. The results provide support for the first law, i.e., impact (grade) as a multiplicative resultant of strength, immediacy, and number of interactions among students. Additional interesting insights were observed in this study that educators ought to consider to maximize the integration of new social technologies into pedagogy.

References

Sources

External links
http://www.staff.ncl.ac.uk/daniel.nettle/lingua1.pdf

Social influence
Sociological theories
Attitude change